The 2002 FIBA World Championship squads were the squads of the 2002 FIBA World Championship.  The list includes the 12-men rosters of the 16 participating countries, totaling 192 players.

Group A

Angola

Canada

Spain

FR Yugoslavia

Group B

Brazil

Lebanon

Puerto Rico

 José Ortiz
 Rick Apodaca
 Luis Ruiz
 Carlos Arroyo
 Christian Dalmau
 Elías Larry Ayuso
 Antonio Latimer
 Rolando Hourruitiner
 Félix Javier Pérez
 Richie Dalmau
 Daniel Santiago
Jerome Mincy
coach: ?

Turkey

Group C

Algeria

China

Germany

United States

Group D

Argentina

New Zealand

Russia

Venezuela

 Víctor Díaz
 Pablo Ezequiel Machado
 Yumerving Ernesto Mijares
 Richard Lugo
 Alejandro Jose Quiroz
 Óscar Torres
 Diego Guevara
 Carl Herrera
 Héctor Romero
 Vladimir Heredia
 Tomás Aguilera
 Carlos Morris
coach:James Calvin

References

External links
 
 

squads
FIBA Basketball World Cup squads